Prebensen is a Norwegian surname. Notable people with the surname include:

Inger Prebensen (born 1945), Norwegian jurist and banker
Nikolai Prebensen (1850–1938), Norwegian politician
Per Preben Prebensen (1895–1961), Norwegian diplomat

Norwegian-language surnames